Somatidia ruficornis is a species of beetle in the family Cerambycidae. It was described by New Zealand entomologist Thomas Broun in 1914.

References

ruficornis
Beetles described in 1914